Christina Erdel (born January 18, 1995 in Düsseldorf, Germany) is a German figure skater. She is the 2011 German bronze medalist and the 2008 Novice bronze medalist.

Erdel represented the Skating club of Düsseldorf (DEG) until she moved with her coach to Oberstdorf in 2010. She now represents the Skating Club of Oberstdorf.

Programs

Competitive highlights

External links
 
 Tracings.net profile
 Figure Skating Corner profile

References
 2010 Bavarian Open Senior Ladies Results
 2010 Heiko Fischer Pokal
 2010 German Figure Skating Championships
 2009 German Junior Ladies Figure Skating Championships
 2009 Bavarian Open Junior Ladies Results
 2008 German Novice Ladies Figure Skating Championships

1995 births
Living people
German female single skaters
Sportspeople from Düsseldorf